Mycobacterium frederiksbergense is a species of the phylum Actinomycetota (Gram-positive bacteria with high guanine and cytosine content, one of the dominant phyla of all bacteria), belonging to the genus Mycobacterium.

Etymology: frederiksbergense, of Frederiksberg, Denmark, referring to the place of isolation.

Type strain
First isolated in Frederiksberg, Denmark.
Strain FAn9 = CIP 107205 = DSM 44346 = NRRL B-24126.

References

Willumsen et al. 2001.  Mycobacterium frederiksbergense sp. nov., a novel polycyclic aromatic hydrocarbon-degrading Mycobacterium species. Int. J. Syst. Evol. Microbiol., 51, 1715–1722.

External links
Type strain of Mycobacterium frederiksbergense at BacDive -  the Bacterial Diversity Metadatabase

Acid-fast bacilli
frederiksbergense
Bacteria described in 2001